The Bantamweight (54 kg) competition at the 2014 AIBA Women's World Boxing Championships was held from 16 to 24 November 2014.

Medalists

Draw

Preliminaries

Top half

Bottom half

Final

References

Bantamweight